An election for the National Assembly was held in Lagos State, Nigeria on Saturday, 22 February 2019.

Results
The results of the elections were announced by Prof. Prof. Temitope Ogunmodede. Released on 24 February 2019, the All Progressives Congress emerged victorious over the Peoples Democratic Party, winning most seats.

Senate

Lagos East Senate district

Lagos West Senate district

Lagos Central Senate district

House of Representatives

As of 15 March 2019, elected members were:

See also
2019 Nigerian general election
2019 Nigerian House of Representatives elections in Lagos State
2019 Nigerian Senate elections in Lagos State

References

Lagos State
National Assembly
February 2019 events in Nigeria